This is a list of flag bearers who have represented Sierra Leone at the Olympics.

Flag bearers carry the national flag of their country at the opening ceremony of the Olympic Games.

See also
Sierra Leone at the Olympics

References

Sierra Leone at the Olympics
Sierra Leone
Olympic flagbearers
Olympics